Série 592, nicknamed Espanholas and Camelos, is a Spanish train type currently used in Portugal by Comboios de Portugal on the Minho, Douro and Oeste lines.

References

External links 
 Page about CP 0450 on Trainlogistic

Diesel multiple units of Portugal